Bygones is an outdoor 1976 sculpture by Mark di Suvero, installed at Houston's Menil Collection, in the U.S. state of Texas. The abstract, geometric sculpture is made of Cor-ten beams and a milled steel plate, and measures 25 ft. 11 in. x 31 ft. 6 in. x 14 ft. 2 in.

See also

 List of public art in Houston

References

1976 sculptures
Abstract sculptures in Texas
Neartown, Houston
Outdoor sculptures in Houston
Steel sculptures in Texas